An election to Limerick City and County Council took place on 23 May 2014 as part of that year's Irish local elections. 40 councillors were elected from six electoral divisions by PR-STV voting for a five-year term of office. This is a new local authority which was formed out of a merger from the abolished Limerick City Council and Limerick County Councils.

Significantly Fianna Fáil emerged as the largest party on the Council after the elections despite being 3,838 first preference votes behind Fine Gael. The party won seats in Limerick city, historically a weak area for them in local elections. Its best results were in Cappaghmore-Kilmallock and Limerick City East where they secured 3 seats in each LEA. Fine Gael were disadvantaged by the merger of the 2 local authorities as they held many councillors on the old City Council and several of these Councillors were defeated under the new boundaries. However, the party won 3 seats in Newcastle West. It was a very poor election for Labour as they just returned 1 seat in each of the 3 city LEAs just as did the Anti-Austerity Alliance. Sinn Féin sent a delegation of 6 councillors back to the new chamber to join their existing member Maurice Quinlivan. Independents secured the remaining 3 seats, 1 of which was Emmett O'Brien a former member of the Fianna Fáil National Executive. After the elections 4 of the Fianna Fáil members broke away to form an independent block over an internal disagreement over who should secure the Chairmanship of the Council. This was later resolved after intercession by Party Headquarters and they rejoined the Fianna Fáil grouping.

Results by party

Results by Electoral Area

Adare-Rathkeale

Cappamore-Kilmallock

Limerick City East

Limerick City North

Limerick City West

Newcastle West

References

Changes since 2014
† Limerick City West Anti-Austerity Alliance Cllr John Loftus was expelled from the party and became an Independent after sending death threats on Facebook.
†† On 14 December 2015 Adare-Rathkeale Fianna Fáil Cllr Richard O'Donoghue quit the party and became an Independent citing dissatisfaction that he had not been chosen as a candidate for the Limerick County constituency in the 2016 Irish general election.. He re-joined the party in 2017.
††† Limerick City East Fianna Fáil Cllr Shane Clifford announced he was resigning his seat with effect from 31 December 2015 citing personal and family reasons. Joe Pond was co-opted to fill the vacancy on 14 March 2016.
†††† On 15 February 2016 Limerick City North Fianna Fáil Cllr Joe Crowley died suddenly while canvassing with Willie O'Dea TD in Limerick East during the 2016 Irish general election. His daughter, Vivienne, was co-opted to fill the vacancy on 14 March 2016.
††††† Adare-Rathkeale Fine Gael Councillor Tom Neville was elected as a TD for Limerick County at the Irish general election 2016. Adam Teskey was co-opted to fill the vacancy on 14 March 2016.
†††††† Limerick City North Sinn Féin Cllr Maurice Quinlivan was elected as a TD for the constituency of Limerick City at the Irish general election, 2016. John Costelloe was co-opted to fill the vacancy on 21 March 2016.
††††††† Limerick City West Fine Gael Cllr Maria Byrne was elected to the Seanad in April 2016. On 22 October 2016 her cousin, Elenora Hogan, was co-opted to fill the vacancy.
†††††††† Cappamore-Kilmallock Sinn Féin Cllr Lisa-Marie Sheehy resigned from the party and became an Independent on 5 September 2017 citing a hostile and toxic environment and a bullying atmosphere.
††††††††† Limerick City North Solidarity Cllr Cian Prendeville resigned for personal reasons on 27 October 2018. Mary Cahillane was co-opted to fill the vacancy on 30 November 2018.

External links
 Official website

2014 Irish local elections
2014